Fernando Etayo Serna is a Colombian paleontologist and geologist. His contributions on the paleontology in Colombia has been mainly on the descriptions of ammonites and Etayo has helped describing many fossiliferous geologic formations of Colombia. Etayo obtained his MSc. degree in geology and geophysics from the Universidad Nacional de Colombia in 1963, and his PhD in paleontology from the University of California, Berkeley in 1975.

Biography 

In 1962, Etayo Serna published his first work about the species Codakia orbicularis and Codakia orbiculata. He has defined many geologic formations of Colombia in the 1960s and 1970s.

Etayo, together with fellow paleontologist María Páramo, collaborated in describing the first dinosaur fossil found in Colombia, Padillasaurus from the Paja Formation, close to Villa de Leyva, Boyacá. His work has been focused on the descriptions of the various ammonites found in the same formation. He also co-authored the 2016 publication about Stenorhynchosaurus munozi, found in the same formation.

Etayo has published in Spanish and English. In 1975, the year Etayo received his PhD degree, he was awarded the Louderbach Memorial Award in Stratigraphy from the University of California, Berkeley.

The ungulate Etayoa bacatensis, found in the Late Paleocene to Early Eocene Bogotá Formation south of Bogotá, has been named in honour of Etayo.

Formations described by Etayo

Works 

This list is a selection.

Books 
 1994 - Estudios geológicos del Valle Superior del Magdalena
 1986 - Evaluación de los recursos minerales no combustibles de Colombia
 1983 - Mapa de terrenos geológicos de Colombia
 1979 - Zonation of the Cretaceous of central Colombia by ammonites

Articles 
 2009 - Bioestratigrafía de la Plancha 210 Guateque
 1985 - Paleontología estratigráfica del sistema Cretácico en la Sierra Nevada del Cocuy
 1979 - La fauna de moluscos del Paleoceno de Colombia. I. Moluscos de una capa del Paleoceno de Manantial (Guajira)
 1968 - El Sistema Cretáceo en la región de Villa de Leiva y zonas próximas
 1964 - Posición de las faunas en los depósitos cretácicos colombianos y su valor en la subdivisión cronológica de los mismos
 1962 - Comprobación biométrica de las especies Codakia orbicularis y Codakia orbiculata

See also 

 Geology of the Altiplano Cundiboyacense
 Geology of the Eastern Hills of Bogotá
 Bogotá Formation
 Etayoa bacatensis
 María Páramo

References

Bibliography

Notable works by Etayo

Maps

External links 
  Profile of Fernando Etayo Serna

Living people
Year of birth missing (living people)
Colombian geologists
Colombian paleontologists
~
National University of Colombia alumni
University of California, Berkeley alumni